Prăjești is a commune in Bacău County, Western Moldavia, Romania. It is composed of a single village, Prăjești. It was part of Traian Commune until 2005, when it was split off as a separate commune.

Natives
Ernest Maftei

References

Communes in Bacău County
Localities in Western Moldavia